To Live in Discontent is a compilation album released by Strike Anywhere. It collects various rare, live and unreleased tracks by the band including the entirety of their out of print EP, Chorus of One.

Track listing

References

Strike Anywhere albums
2005 compilation albums
Jade Tree (record label) albums